"Title" is a song by American singer-songwriter Meghan Trainor from her 2014 debut extended play of the same name. Kevin Kadish produced the song and wrote it with Trainor. Epic Records considered it for release as Trainor's second single, but it was eventually scrapped in favor of "Lips Are Movin" (2014). A doo-wop and pop song with Caribbean influences, Trainor demands her partner to define their relationship more clearly and call her his girlfriend in its lyrics.

"Title" received mixed reviews from music critics, with commentary directed towards its lyrics, production, and rap verse. The song reached number nine in New Zealand, and earned Gold certifications from Recorded Music NZ and the Recording Industry Association of America. It entered the charts in various countries after becoming a trend on video-sharing service TikTok in 2021.

Anthony Phan directed the music video for "Title", which depicts Trainor performing it at a Mr. America-style beauty pageant. Initially released exclusively on the special edition of Trainor's 2015 debut major-label studio album of the same name, the video was uploaded online in December 2021. Trainor performed the song at the 2014 iHeartRadio Music Festival, in sessions for MTV and the National Post, and included it on the set lists of her 2015 concert tours That Bass Tour and MTrain Tour.

Background 
American songwriter Kevin Kadish met Meghan Trainor in June 2013 at the request of Carla Wallace, the co-owner of Trainor's publishing firm Big Yellow Dog Music. Kadish liked Trainor's voice and felt a strong song-writing affinity with her due to their mutual love of pop music from the 1950s and 1960s. They wrote the song "All About That Bass", which led to Trainor signing with Epic Records after she performed it for the label's chairman, L.A. Reid. Kadish and Trainor began working on more songs immediately as the label wanted her to record an entire album. It was released as Trainor's debut single in June 2014, and reached numberone in 58 countries, selling 11 million units worldwide.

Kadish and Trainor wrote "Title" as the second track for Trainor's 1950s-influenced debut extended play (EP) of the same name (2014), which they created "just for fun". Trainor considered its Caribbean drum and rap bridge new territory for her, that showcased "what [her] sound really is". She recounted being ill-treated by her romantic partners in high school, and was inspired to write the song about issues with contemporary dating and hookup culture, like women basing their self worth on social media likes and whether their partner replied to their texts. Trainor described it in an interview: "Call me your girlfriend, I'm sick of being your boo thing, so call me your girlfriend and give me that title".

MTV News premiered "Title" on September 5, 2014, and it was released along with the EP four days later. That month, the website reported that the song would serve as Trainor's second single. She revealed in October that it was nearly scrapped in favor of "Dear Future Husband" (2015), which is more sonically similar to "All About That Bass". Kadish went to New York to meet with Reid after writing the song "Lips Are Movin" (2014) with Trainor, and voiced his regret about not having it ready in time for the EP and its potential release as the follow-up single. Reid announced at the meeting that it would replace "Title", and was quoted by Kadish as saying, "I think this song will do better." "Lips Are Movin" reached number four on the US Billboard Hot 100. "Title" was included as the ninth track on her 2015 debut major-label studio album of the same name.

Composition and lyrical interpretation
"Title" is two minutes and 54 seconds long. Kadish produced, recorded, engineered, and mixed the song at the Carriage House studio in Nolensville, Tennessee. He handled drum programming, and plays the acoustic guitar, electric guitar, bass, and synthesizer, Trainor plays the ukulele, and David Baron plays the piano and Hammond organ. Dave Kutch mastered it at The Mastering Palace in New York City.

"Title" is a doo-wop and pop song with Caribbean music influences and a ska-inflected bridge. The song blends the horn and background vocals with ukulele folk-pop and island percussion instrumentation, which morphs into a programmed beat. It also makes use of handclaps and  modern sound effects. Trainor assumes a Patois during the rap verse of "Title". According to Knoxville News Sentinel, she projects an assertive and retro aural tone on the song. MTV News's Christina Garibaldi thought it elicits a "throwback vibe" from its "infectious" beat, and Stereogums Chris DeVille defined it as "modern-retro pastiche".

In the lyrics of "Title", Trainor pushes her partner to define their relationship more clearly and refer to her as his girlfriend. She refuses to be friends with benefits and threatens to leave him if he treats her like a casual hookup. Trainor asks him to "treat [her] like a trophy [and] put [her] on a shelf" and asks him to climb a bike without using his hands. L.V. Anderson of Slate described the song as "the cri de coeur of a woman who's tired of being seen as a casual hookup by the man in her life". Its lyrical theme is the same as "Dear Future Husband", which led Knoxville News Sentinel and DeVille to compare the songs.

Critical reception
Music critics were divided on the lyrics of "Title". Entertainment Weeklys Melissa Maerz remarked that they are perfectly balanced between racy and cute. Garibaldi thought the song sends a powerful message. DeVille did not find its lyrics problematic, and opined that Trainor's insistence for commitment was not disparate from renowned feminist Beyoncé's on her 2008 single "Single Ladies (Put a Ring on It)". Anderson found her intentions understandable and was in awe of her confidence, but thought that "every line of 'Title' perpetuates a retrograde belief about relationships" and sets a horrible precedent for young women.

Writing for New York, Lindsey Weber found that the production of "Title" is "very catchy", and deemed it enjoyable for people who like "All About That Bass". DeVille wrote that though he does not find "DJ scratching and rewind sounds" progressive and extravagant, the song turned out to be cutting and sprightly. Toronto Stars Ben Rayner wrote that it is "whitewashed into a fairly anodyne mush", and declared its "hip-hop bump and plush bassline" an attempt to make Trainor's "old-timey aesthetic" feel contemporary. Garibaldi was positive of her rap verse, while Alexa Camp of Slant Magazine thought it lacked authenticity and Trainor deserved criticism from hip-hop critics because of it, like that which Iggy Azalea receives.

Music video 
Anthony Phan directed the music video for "Title", which was shot at a downtown movie palace in Los Angeles on October 7, 2014. Inspired by the AAU Mr. America pageant, Trainor was accompanied by several filmmakers, and male models who wore sashes, while sporting a sparkling dress and lime green fur at its shoot. In it, Trainor performs "Title" at a Miss America–style pageant, where all of the contestants are muscular men instead of women, while her brother Ryan films them. The contestants get ready in their dressing rooms and walk down a runway in the subsequent stages of the competition. She sings the song on staircases and a flower couch, and concludes the video by crowning a winner.

Promotion 
Trainor performed "Title" as a mashup with "All About That Bass" live for the first time at the 2014 iHeartRadio Music Festival in September 2014. She reprised the song for MTV on October 6, 2014, and in a session for the National Post eight days later. Trainor included it in her set list for the Jingle Ball Tour 2014, and her 2015 concert tours That Bass Tour and MTrain Tour.

The music video for "Title" was initially released exclusively on its parent album's special edition on November 20, 2015. In 2021, the song became a trend on video-sharing service TikTok, when users including moms, social media influencers, teenagers, and celebrities Genelia D'Souza, Stephen Mulhern, Zach Wilson, posted a cumulative 4,659 videos dancing to it. Trainor responded favorably: "I felt like it was my birthday every day, I thought it was the coolest thing ever. It's the quickest way to connect with fans." She teased the video on TikTok on December 14, 2021, and uploaded it to YouTube the following day.

Commercial performance
"Title" charted at number 100 on the US Billboard Hot 100 issued for January 10, 2015, and received a Gold certification from the Recording Industry Association of America. In New Zealand, the song peaked at number nine and became Trainor's second to reach the top 10. Recorded Music NZ certified it Gold. Following its resurgence in 2021, "Title" reached number 31 in Hungary, number 16 in Japan (Hot Overseas), number 31 in Belgium (Ultratip), number 41 in Poland, and number 55 in Vietnam. It became Trainor's second song to enter the Billboard Global Excl. U.S. chart, peaking at number 172.

Credits and personnel
Credits adapted from the liner notes of Title.

Recording
 Recorded, engineered, and mixed at The Carriage House, Nolensville, Tennessee
 Mastered at The Mastering Palace, New York City
 Published by Year of the Dog Music (ASCAP), a division of Big Yellow Dog LLC.

Personnel
 Kevin Kadish – producer, songwriter, recording, engineering, mixing, drum programming, acoustic guitar, electric guitar, bass, synthesizer
 Meghan Trainor – songwriter, ukulele
 Dave Kutch – mastering
 David Baron – piano, Hammond organ

Charts

Certifications

References

2014 songs
Meghan Trainor songs
Doo-wop songs
Songs written by Kevin Kadish
Songs written by Meghan Trainor